The following lists events that happened during 1902 in Australia.

In 1902 women were finally allowed to vote and stand in federal elections.

Incumbents

Monarch – Edward VII
Governor-General – John Hope, 7th Earl of Hopetoun
Prime Minister –  Edmund Barton

State premiers
Premier of New South Wales – John See
Premier of South Australia – John Jenkins
Premier of Queensland – Robert Philp
Premier of Tasmania – Elliott Lewis
Premier of Western Australia – George Leake (until 1 July), then Walter James
Premier of Victoria – Alexander Peacock (until 10 June), then William Irvine

State governors
Governor of New South Wales – Admiral Harry Rawson (from 27 May)
Governor of South Australia – Hallam Tennyson, 2nd Baron Tennyson (until 17 July)
Governor of Queensland – Major General Sir Herbert Chermside (from 24 March)
Governor of Tasmania – Captain Sir Arthur Havelock
Governor of Western Australia – Sir Arthur Lawley (until 14 August)
Governor of Victoria – Sir George Clarke

Events
 7 February – The Waterside Workers Federation is formed.
 April – Averaged over Australia, the driest month on record with only .
 31 May – The Second Boer War, in which Australia is involved, ends.
 12 June – The Commonwealth Franchise Act granted most Australian women the right to vote and stand in federal elections.
 31 July – A coal gas explosion kills 96 in the Mount Kembla mining disaster
 1 August – New Idea magazine is first published.
 3 November – Postmaster-General James Drake opens a submarine telegraph cable from Southport, Queensland to Vancouver, British Columbia, Canada, completing a British Empire communications line.
 18 December – The mayors of Sydney and Melbourne are conferred the title of Lord Mayor
 26 December – Brisbane is declared a city.
 26 December – Ada Evans becomes the first female law graduate in Australia.
 As a culmination of the Federation Drought, this was by raw totals the driest calendar year averaged over Australia since 1890 with only  (though by area-averaged mean decile it was only eleventh driest).

Unknown dates
 The world's first successful pyritic smelting takes place at Mount Lyell, Tasmania

Arts and literature

 17 September – Opera singer Nellie Melba arrives in Brisbane for her first Australian tour after 16 years in Europe.
 James White wins the Wynne Prize with his bronze sculpture In Defence of the Flat

Sport
 27 September – Collingwood wins the 1902 VFL grand final, defeating Essendon 9.6 (60) to 3.9 (27) at the first final to be held at the Melbourne Cricket Ground before a record crowd of 35,000.
 11 November – The Victory wins the Melbourne Cup
 New South Wales wins the Sheffield Shield

Births
 15 January – Dan Dempsey, rugby league footballer (d. 1960)
 25 February – Vince Gair, politician (d. 1980)
 2 May – Alan Marshall, writer (d. 1984)
 22 May – Leslie Herron, Chief Justice of NSW (d. 1973)
 12 July – Vic Armbruster, rugby league footballer (d. 1984)
 17 July – Christina Stead, writer (d. 1983)
 28 July – Albert Namatjira, painter (d. 1959)

Deaths
 27 February – Breaker Morant, convicted military officer, bush poet and drover (born in the United Kingdom and died in South Africa) (b. 1864)
 6 March – Frederick William Piesse, Tasmanian politician (b. 1848)
 24 June – George Leake, 3rd Premier of Western Australia (b. 1856)

See also
1902
1900–1909

References

 
Australia
Years of the 20th century in Australia